The David Octavius Hill Medal is a prize in photography established in 1955, by the Deutsche Fotografische Akademie. It is named in honor of the Scottish artist David Octavius Hill, famous for his Hill & Adamson calotypes, most of which were developed at Adamson's studio, the "Rock House", on Calton Hill in Edinburgh.

Recipients
 1955: Walter Hege, Carl Adolf Schleussner, Erich Stenger, Bruno Uhl
 1957: Albert Renger-Patzsch
 1958: Erna Lendvai-Dircksen
 1964: Herbert List
 1965: Otto Steinert 
 1966: Martin Hürlimann
 1967: Paul Strand 
 1968: Fritz Gruber
 1969: Liselotte Strelow 
 1970: Allan Porter
 1971: Edouard Boubat
 1972: Regina Relang
 1973: J.A. Schmoll, gen. Eisenwerth
 1974: Fritz Kempe
 1978: Heinz Hajek-Halke, Willi Moegle 
 1979: Fritz Brill, Kurt Julius 
 1981: Peter Keetman 
 1983: Helmut Gernsheim 
 1984: Robert Häusser
 1986: John Hilliard
 1988: Joan Fontcuberta
 1990: Stefan Moses
 1994: Jürgen Heinemann, Klaus Kammerichs
 1996: Gottfried Jäger
 1999: Dieter Appelt
 2002: Alex Webb
 2005: Bernhard Prinz
 2009: Joakim Eskildsen, Cia Rinne
 2015: Viviane Sassen
 2019: Ute & Werner Mahler

References 

 Träger der David-Octavius-Hill-Medaille (German). Accessed January 24, 2010.

Photography awards
German awards
Awards established in 1955
Photography in Germany
1955 establishments in Germany